Bhagirathi Devi (born 12 January 1954) is an Indian politician. She is a member of the Bihar Legislative Assembly, and currently represents Ramnagar, Paschim Champaran.

She hails from a Mahadalit family from Narkatiaganj in Bihar. Bhagirathi again contested from Ramnagar assembly seat in 2015 Bihar Legislative Assembly election against Congress candidate and won the seat. In April 2015, Bhagirathi Devi fought with Annu Shukla of ruling Janata Dal (United) during the Zero Hour in Bihar Legislative Assembly over the issue of non-payment of wage under MGNREGA scheme. Bhagirathi Devi initially won elections from now-defunct Shikarpur (Vidhan Sabha constituency) in 2000 and 2005. She is married to a railway employee, Mamikhan Raut.

Award 
In 2019, she was honoured with the Padma Shri Award.

Social work
Bhagirathi allowed the Anganwadi Kendra (child care centres) to open its office in her house in West Champaran district. She especially worked in the field of girls’ education. Bhagirathi  spent several years creating mahila sangathans (women's groups) in Narkatiyaganj block, organising women and creating awareness around issues that included domestic violence, violence against dalits and fair wages. She later expanded her political activism to other blocks in the district, going to jail in 1991 for organising demonstrations.

See also
 Jitan Ram Manjhi
 Manoj Bajpai

References

External links
 

Bharatiya Janata Party politicians from Bihar
People from Araria
1954 births
Living people
Women members of the Bihar Legislative Assembly
Bihar MLAs 2000–2005
Bihar MLAs 2005–2010
Bihar MLAs 2010–2015
People from West Champaran district
21st-century Indian women politicians
21st-century Indian politicians
20th-century Indian women politicians
20th-century Indian politicians
Recipients of the Padma Shri in public affairs
Bihar MLAs 2015–2020
Bihar MLAs 2020–2025